Jang Woo-hyuk (Hangul: 장우혁; Hanja: 張佑赫; born May 8, 1978) is a South Korean singer and rapper. He debuted in 1996 as a member of the best-selling K-pop boy band H.O.T. After the band broke up due to a contract dispute, Jang and two other former members formed the boy band jtL, which was active from 2001 to 2003. Jang also released two full-length albums and two extended plays as a solo artist. He is the founder of talent agency WH Entertainment.

H.O.T.

As a member of H.O.T. he was known for being a dancer of the group, and was known for his strong vocal screams in his rap. His nicknames have been "Hammer Boy" for his famous hammer dance from H.O.T.s debut single; Candy. Another well-known nickname of him was "tough guy". When H.O.T disbanded in 2001, Woo Hyuk and two other H.O.T members; Tony An and Lee Jae Won dropped out of SM and formed the trio jtL.

JTL

When JTL was created, H.O.T. fans had mixed feelings for JTL. Many of JTL's music videos were boycotted and their performance was hindered by the ex-agency SM Entertainment. However, things changed around when JTL held a 'Guerilla Concert' in front of 12,000 fans.

Solo
JTL unofficially disbanded in 2003 as its members began pursuing solo careers. Woo Hyuk became the CEO of Newest Entertainment (a dancing academy).
Woo Hyuk collaborated with Kenzie, Pang Shi Hyuk, and many other talented K-pop musicians. Music lovers thirsting for groovy R&B style beats plus a flair of hip hop all blended with Woo Hyuk's inimitable vocals are well advised to check out the release of No More Drama. To prepare for his solo album, Jang Woo Hyuk underwent 10 months of dance training.

Jang Woo Hyuk has become popular in the Chinese and Taiwanese markets. In a poll held on China's largest portal site, sina.com, Woo Hyuk topped two categories, beating out Rain by 500 votes in the poll: "Who do you think is the most popular South Korean singer in China?" and more than double the votes in dancing. He has expressed his deep interest of making appearances in China and Taiwan. During the beginning of April 2006, he started his first promotion in China and finally created his official fan club in China; however, he has never held a concert in Taiwan.

On December 18, 2009, Jang Woo-Hyuk has recently finished his military service. After his exit, he had a short press conference and said "The biggest difference is my weight. Compared to myself from beginning of the military service, I had lost 14–15 kilograms [c. 30 lb]. Right before I started my military service, I had gained lots of weight." About 50 fans were also present during the press conference. He said to the fans, "I was surprised by the number of fans who came to see me. I will soon come back with an improved version of myself." In 2010 Jang Woo Hyuk signed a contract to sing in China.  It is said that he might be rejoining H.O.T.

His new album released May 25 entitled " I am The Future ", with singles including Time is [L]over, I am the Future, and Minimalism.

On May 28 Jang Woo Hyuk made his live comeback with the single " Time Is [L]over " on Strong Heart. The song has garnered interests from netizens, commenting on the videos praising him saying " If i saw him walking in the streets I would have never though he was 33 " and " He is a very good dancer, Eunhyuk was inspired by him thats why they both are very good. "

In July 2011, Jang Woo came out with a new single: Weekend Night.

On November 17, 2022, WH Creative announced that Jang will hold a Winter Story 'From echo' fan meeting, which will take place both online and offline on December 17.

Discography

Studio albums

Extended plays

Singles

Filmography
 Filial Son's Village (2022) - Cast Member
 Love in the Office (2015)
 The Secret Angel (2012)

Awards

Mnet Asian Music Awards

References

External links
 

1978 births
Living people
South Korean choreographers
H.O.T. (band) members
South Korean Buddhists
South Korean breakdancers
South Korean male actors
South Korean male idols
South Korean male rappers
South Korean male singers
South Korean pop singers
South Korean hip hop dancers